Sir Christopher Musgrave, 4th Baronet (c. 1632 – 29 July 1704) was an English landowner and politician who sat in the House of Commons from 1661 to 1704, and briefly became Father of the House in 1704 as the member with the longest unbroken service.

Musgrave was the son of  Sir Philip Musgrave, 2nd Baronet of Edenhall and his wife Julia Hutton daughter of Sir Richard Hutton of Goldsborough, Yorkshire. He matriculated at Queen's College, Oxford on 10 July 1651 and was awarded his B.A. on the same date. He was a student of Gray's Inn in 1654. As a young man, he was active in the Royal cause. He was captain of the Guards before 1661.

In 1661, Musgrave was elected Member of Parliament for Carlisle in the Cavalier Parliament. He was knighted in 1671 and was Mayor of Carlisle in 1672. In 1677 he was governor of Carlisle. He was re-elected MP for Carlisle in the two elections of 1679, in 1681 and in 1685 and was a Commissioner of the Ordnance from 1679 to 1681. He succeeded to the baronetcy on the death of his brother in about 1687.
 
In 1690 Musgrave was elected MP for Westmorland. He was elected MP for Appleby in 1695 and for Oxford University in 1698. In 1700 he was elected MP for Westmorland for a second time and in 1701 he was elected MP for Totnes. He was elected MP for Westmorland for the third time in 1702. In 1702 Queen Anne made him one of the four tellers of the Exchequer.

Musgrave died of apoplexy at the age of  72 at St. James', Westminster and was buried at Trinity Minories, London.

Musgrave married firstly on 31 May 1660 Mary Cogan eldest daughter of Sir Andrew Cogan, of East Greenwich,  Kent. She died in childbirth at Carlisle Castle on 8 July 1664 aged 27 and was buried at St. Cuthbert's, Edenhall. He married  secondly by licence dated 16 April 1671 Elizabeth Francklyn daughter of Sir John Francklyn, of Willesden, Middlesex. She 
died on 11 April 1701, and was buried at Edenhall.

References

 

|-

1630s births
1704 deaths

Year of birth uncertain
English landowners
Baronets in the Baronetage of England
Alumni of The Queen's College, Oxford
Members of Gray's Inn
Mayors of Carlisle, Cumbria
Cavaliers
English MPs 1661–1679
English MPs 1679
English MPs 1680–1681
English MPs 1681
English MPs 1685–1687
English MPs 1689–1690
English MPs 1690–1695
English MPs 1695–1698
English MPs 1698–1700
English MPs 1701
English MPs 1701–1702
English MPs 1702–1705
Members of the Parliament of England (pre-1707) for Totnes
Christopher